The Cremane House is a historic house in White County, Arkansas. It is a two-story wood frame double-pile structure, with a bellcast roof and novelty siding. It was built c. 1910, and is one of a small number of vernacular houses to survive in the county from this period.

The house was listed on the National Register of Historic Places in 1992.

See also
National Register of Historic Places listings in White County, Arkansas

References

Houses on the National Register of Historic Places in Arkansas
Houses completed in 1910
Houses in White County, Arkansas
National Register of Historic Places in White County, Arkansas
1910 establishments in Arkansas